Slavic piracy  may refer to:

 Baltic Slavic piracy
 Neretva pirates
 Uskoci